Ambrose G. Davis (January 1863 – January 27, 1909) was an American Negro league outfielder and team owner in the 1880s and 1890s.

A native of New York, New York, Davis was founder and owner of the New York Gorhams, and played for the club in 1887 and again in 1891. He died in New York City in 1909 at age 45 or 46.

References

External links
Baseball statistics and player information from Baseball-Reference Black Baseball Stats and Seamheads

1863 births
1909 deaths
Date of birth missing
New York Gorhams players
20th-century African-American people